The 2021 Belgian Super Cup is a football match that took place on 17 July 2021 between Club Brugge, the winners of the 2020–21 Belgian First Division A, and Genk, the winners of the 2020–21 Belgian Cup. Genk made its ninth Super Cup appearance after beating Standard Liège in the 2021 Belgian Cup Final on 25 April 2021. For Club Brugge it was its nineteenth Super Cup appearance, and subsequent sixteenth win.

Match

Summary
Both clubs were missing several key players going into the match, most notably Simon Mignolet, Eduard Sobol, Hans Vanaken and Ruud Vormer for Club Brugge; and Gerardo Arteaga, Carlos Cuesta, Eboue Kouassi, Jhon Lucumí, Daniel Muñoz and Kristian Thorstvedt for Genk. As a result, both managers were forced to experiment. 

Despite starting with youngsters Noah Mbamba (16) and Odilon Kossounou (20) in central midfield, Club Brugge started strongly and pinned Genk to its own half, however without creating any chances. It was instead Genk who managed to create some danger first, as Paul Onuachu's diving header, following a cross by Ángelo Preciado, sailed narrowly over the bar. Club Brugge kept controlling the match, but with limited attempts on goal to threaten Genk-goalie Maarten Vandevoordt. Just before halftime, Genk again managed to set up a dangerous attack, with new signing Mike Trésor Ndayishimiye finding Bryan Heynen whose pass split open the Club Brugge defense to find Théo Bongonda who easily slotted the ball past 19-year old goalkeeper Senne Lammens. Still before half time, Club Brugge managed to equalize as a corner kick was headed in by Matej Mitrović via Vandevoort. Trésor Ndayishimiye was just late in kicking the ball away as it had already crossed the line.

Club Brugge started the second half in overdrive, knocking out Genk in just a few minutes: Noa Lang was fouled by Preciado in the penalty area and converted the penalty kick himself in absence of Vormer and Vanaken. Immediately thereafter, Clinton Mata extended the lead with a powerful strike which deflected via goalkeeper Vandevoort and the underside of the crossbar into the goal: 3–1. Manager John van den Brom tried to turn the tide using a few substitutions, but could only notice Club Brugge getting stronger and continuing to dominate the match. Mats Rits came close to a fourth for Club Brugge with some 20 minutes to play, but his sneaky freekick hit the outside of the post. Towards the very end of the match, Genk finally was able to create some pressure, with Lammens required to make several strong saves. Eventually, a misunderstanding between Lammens and Mitrović allowed Jere Uronen to score with a blistering strike from about 20 meters, but after that Club Brugge easily held on to win 3–2.

Details

See also
2020–21 Belgian First Division A
2020–21 Belgian Cup

References

2021
Club Brugge KV matches
K.R.C. Genk matches
Supercup
Belgian Super Cup